Carlos Adriel Montenegro Rodríguez (born 7 January 1991) is a professional footballer who plays as a centre back for Cartaginés. Born in Costa Rica, he represents the Nicaragua national team.

International career
Montenegro was born in Costa Rica to a Costa Rican father and a Nicaraguan mother. He made his senior debut for Nicaragua on 7 June 2019, starting in a friendly match against Argentina before being substituted at half time.

References

External links
 
 NFT Profile

1991 births
Living people
People from Heredia (canton)
People with acquired Nicaraguan citizenship
Nicaraguan men's footballers
Nicaragua international footballers
Costa Rican men's footballers
Nicaraguan people of Costa Rican descent
Costa Rican people of Nicaraguan descent
Association football central defenders
2019 CONCACAF Gold Cup players
Liga FPD players
A.D. Carmelita footballers